Steenberg is the surname of the following people
 Erland Steenberg (1919–2009), Norwegian politician
 Per Steenberg (1870–1947), Norwegian organist and composer 
 Schack August Steenberg Krogh (1874–1949), Danish physiologists
 Tommy Steenberg (born 1988), American figure skater
 Irenei Steenberg (born 1978), Eastern Orthodox bishop

See also
Steenberghe
Steenbergen (surname)